Articles on Cricklewood include:

 Cricklewood, a district of North London
 Cricklewood Aerodrome, closed 1929
 Cricklewood Baptist Church, London
 Cricklewood Green, music album
 Cricklewood (New Zealand)
 Cricklewood Pumping Station, London
 Cricklewood railway station, London